Tajikistan competed at the 2014 Summer Youth Olympics, in Nanjing, China from 16 August to 28 August 2014.

Archery

Tajikistan was given a quota to compete by the tripartite committee.

Individual

Team

Athletics

Tajikistan qualified one athlete.

Qualification Legend: Q=Final A (medal); qB=Final B (non-medal); qC=Final C (non-medal); qD=Final D (non-medal); qE=Final E (non-medal)

Girls
Track & road events

Judo

Tajikistan was given a quota to compete by the tripartite committee.

Individual

Team

Shooting

Tajikistan was given a wild card to compete.

Individual

Team

Swimming

Tajikistan qualified one swimmer.

Girls

Wrestling

Tajikistan qualified three athletes based on its performance at the 2014 European Cadet Championships.

Boys

References

2014 in Tajikistani sport
Nations at the 2014 Summer Youth Olympics
Tajikistan at the Youth Olympics